The Serbia national rugby union team is classified as a tier three nation by World Rugby, and has yet to qualify for the Rugby World Cup. They have played over 100 internationals.

The national side is ranked 80th in the world, as of 16 January 2023.

History

The first known rugby players from Serbia were Serbian students in George Heriot's School in Edinburgh, Scotland during The First World War. On March, 9th 1918 they played their first unofficial international game, in front of 10,000 spectators, against a British Dominions VII and won by eight points to three. Notable players from this period included Toma Tomić from Leskovac, Dimitrije Dulkanović from Ćuprija and Danilo Pavlović from Prokuplje. 
Serbian students also played rugby at the High School of Dundee and Hillhead High School in Glasgow. The best Serbian player in Scotland was Slavoljub DJordjevic from Čajetina. He played more than 100 games for Hillhead HS, Glasgow University RFC and Hillhead RFC in Scotland rugby top competitions.

Serbia played as a part of Yugoslavia since 1919 until 1992, then as FR Yugoslavia until 2003, and, finally, as Serbia and Montenegro from 2003 to 2006. Yugoslavia made their official international debut in 1968 against a Romanian XV, losing 3 points to 11. They made their full test debut the following month, losing 6 points to 29 against Bulgaria. They won their first official international match in 1969, defeating Bulgaria 22 points to six.

During the 60s, 70s and 80s, Serbian players played for the Yugoslavia national rugby union team alongside players from the rest of Yugoslavia. After the wars and breakup of Yugoslavia, the Yugoslavia team consisted of players from Serbia only, and they played their first full international against  at Vršac in 1996.

After 1996, playing as FR Yugoslavia and Serbia and Montenegro until 2006, they have played regularly in FIRA-AER and IRB competitions.

Current squad

Senior Squad:

Results

As the Federal Republic of Yugoslavia (1996–2002)

As Serbia and Montenegro (2003–2006)

As Serbia (2006–)

Overall
Below is table of the representative rugby matches played by a Serbia national XV at test level up until 2022-05-08

Player records

Most caps

Last updated: Bosnia&Herzegovina vs Serbia, 7 May 2022. Statistics include officially capped matches only.

Top point scorers

Youngest players

Last updated: Serbia vs Andorra, 16 April 2022. Statistics include officially capped matches only.

Oldest players

Last updated: Serbia vs Andorra, 16 April 2022. Statistics include officially capped matches only.

World Cup record
 1987 – No qualifying tournament held
 1991 – Did not qualify. Yugoslavia was eliminated by Czechoslovakia in European qualifying.
 1995 – Did not qualify. Yugoslavia was banned from European qualifying due to political situation in the country at that time.
 1999 – Did not qualify
 2003 – Did not qualify
 2007 – Did not qualify
 2011 – Did not qualify
 2015 – Did not qualify
 2019 – Did not qualify
 2023 – Did not qualify

See also
 2007 Rugby World Cup - European qualification

References

External links
 Serbia and Montenegro on IRB.com
 Serbia and Montenegro on rugbydata.com
 Official site
 
 

Rugby union
Teams in European Nations Cup (rugby union)
European national rugby union teams
Rugby union in Serbia